Léo Vincent (born 6 November 1995) is a French former cyclist, who rode professionally for the  team between 2017 and 2020. He competed in the 2018 Vuelta a España, finishing 77th overall.

Major results

2015
 1st Stage 4 Ronde de l'Isard
 1st Stage 5 Tour des Pays de Savoie
2016
 3rd Overall Ronde de l'Isard
 4th Overall Tour des Pays de Savoie
2017
 1st  Young rider classification Tour La Provence

Grand Tour general classification results timeline

References

External links

Sportspeople from Vesoul
1995 births
Living people
French male cyclists
Cyclists from Bourgogne-Franche-Comté